Isaac Sponaugle is an American  attorney and former member of the West Virginia House of Delegates, representing the 55th District from 2013 till 2020. Sponaugle served as an intern to Senator Robert Byrd. Sponaugle gave up his seat to be a candidate for the Democratic nomination to be West Virginia's Attorney General in 2020 and lost the race by just 145 votes, but he conceded without any request for a recount, hoping to unify his party behind nominee Sam Petsonk in order to defeat Patrick Morrisey, the Republican incumbent.

References

External links
 
Legislative page

1979 births
21st-century American politicians
Living people
Democratic Party members of the West Virginia House of Delegates
People from Harrisonburg, Virginia
West Virginia University alumni